Metyrapone, sold under the brand name Metopirone, is a medication which is used in the diagnosis of adrenal insufficiency and occasionally in the treatment of Cushing's syndrome (hypercortisolism).

Medical uses
Metyrapone can be used in the diagnosis of adrenal insufficiency. Metyrapone 30 mg/kg, maximum dose 3,000 mg, is administered at midnight usually with a snack. The plasma cortisol and 11-deoxycortisol are measured the next morning between 8:00 and 9:00 am. A plasma cortisol less than 220 nmol/L indicates adequate inhibition of 11β-hydroxylase. In patients with intact Hypothalamo-pituitary-adrenal axis, CRH and ACTH levels rise as a response to the falling cortisol levels. This results in an increase of the steroid precursors in the pathway. Therefore, if 11-deoxycortisol levels do not rise and remain less than 7 µg/dL (202 nmol/L) and adrenocorticotropic hormone (ACTH) rises, then it is highly suggestive of adrenal insufficiency. If neither 11-deoxycortisol nor ACTH rise, it is highly suggestive of an impaired hypothalamic–pituitary–adrenal axis at either the pituitary or hypothalamus.

The metyrapone test may aid in verifying the cause of Cushing's syndrome. Most patients with pituitary dysfunction and/or pituitary microadenoma will increase ACTH secretion in response to metyrapone, while most ectopic ACTH-producing tumors will not. Pituitary macroadenomas do not always respond to metyrapone.

Metyrapone is used for the medical control of hypercortisolism in Cushing's syndrome (ACTH dependent or independent). The aim for medical treatment is to achieve pre-operative control of hypercortisolism, or for control of residual disease persisting post-operatively (TSS, adrenalectomy). It is not for long term definitive treatment/cure, only as an adjunct (surgery is the aim for cure in most causes of Cushing's syndrome). Metyrapone hence acts by inhibiting adrenal steroidogenesis. One side effect is hirsutism (in women) because of the excess androgen precursors created. The other commonly used agent for medical treatment of Cushing's is ketoconazole (an anti-fungal agent). This does not exhibit the side effect of hirsutism.

Pharmacology

Pharmacodynamics
Metyrapone blocks cortisol steroidogenesis by acting as a reversible inhibitor of 11β-hydroxylase. This stimulates adrenocorticotropic hormone (ACTH) secretion, which in turn increases plasma 11-deoxycortisol levels.

Chemistry
Analogues of metyrapone include aminoglutethimide, amphenone B, and mitotane.

Research
Metyrapone has been found in early human trials to reduce recollection of emotional memories in normal volunteers. The volunteers showed significant impairment in ability to retrieve memories with negative emotional content while not impairing memories with neutral content. This has significant implication in the study of the process of emotional healing in post traumatic stress disorder.

Due to the permissive action of cortisol on glucagon, partial blockade of cortisol may reduce
the effects of circulating glucagon in chronically increasing blood glucose in metabolic syndrome (syndrome X) and type 2 diabetes.

See also
 ACTH stimulation test

References

3β-Hydroxysteroid dehydrogenase inhibitors
11β-Hydroxylase inhibitors
21-Hydroxylase inhibitors
Aldosterone synthase inhibitors
Antiglucocorticoids
3-Pyridyl compounds